Alipore Sadar subdivision is an administrative subdivision of the South 24 Parganas district in the Indian state of West Bengal.

Subdivisions
South 24 Parganas district is divided into five administrative subdivisions:

18.26% of the total population of South 24 Parganas district live in Alipore Sadar subdivision.

Administrative units
Alipore Sadar subdivision has 5 police stations, 5 community development blocks, 5 panchayat samitis, 45 gram panchayats, 268 mouzas, 243 inhabited villages, 3 municipalities and 36 census towns. The municipalities are at Budge Budge, Maheshtala and Pujali . The census towns are: Joka, Chata Kalikapur, Ganye Gangadharpur, Rameswarpur, Asuti, Hanspukuria, Kalua, Ramchandrapur, Samali, Uttar Raypur, Balarampur, Buita, Benjanhari Acharial (P), Abhirampur, Nischintapur,  Birlapur, Chak Kashipur, Chak Alampur, Bowali, Dakshin Raypur, Poali, Daulatpur, Bhasa, Bishnupur, Kanyanagar, Nahazari, Nadabhanga, Kanganbaria, Bora Gagangohalia, Chanddandaha, Barkalikapur, Patharberia, Ramkrishnapur, Amtala, Kriparampur and Chak Enayetnagar.

Kolkata Urban Agglomeration
The following Municipalities and census towns in South 24 Parganas district were part of Kolkata Urban Agglomeration in the 2011 census: Maheshtala (M), Joka (CT), Balarampur (CT), Chata Kalikapur (CT), Budge Budge (M), Nischintapur (CT), Uttar Raypur (CT), Pujali (M) and Rajpur Sonarpur (M).

Police stations
Police stations in Alipore Sadar subdivision have the following features and jurisdiction:

Blocks
Community development blocks in Alipore Sadar subdivision are:

Gram panchayats
The subdivision contains 43 gram panchayats under 5 community development blocks:

 Bishnupur I CD block consists of 11 gram panchayats: Amgachhia, Dakshin Gauripur Chakdhir, Kulerdari, Raskhali, Andhar Manik, Panakua, Bhandaria Kastekumari, Julpia, Paschim Bishnupur, Keoradanga and Purba Bishnupur.
 Bishnupur II CD block consists of 11 gram panchayats: Bakhrahat, Kanganbaria, Patharberia Jaychandipur, Chak Enayetnagar, Khagramuri, Chandi, Maukhali, Ramkrishnapur Borhanpur, Gobindapur Kalicharanpur, Nahazari and Panchanan.
 Budge Budge I CD block consists of six gram panchayats: Buita, Mayapur, Rajibpur, Chingripota, Nischintapur and Uttar Raypur.
 Budge Budge II CD block consists of 11 gram panchayats: Burul, Gaja Poyali, Naskarpur, Satgachhia, Chakmanik, Kamrabad, North Baoyali, South Baoyali, Dongaria Raipur, Kasipur Alampur and Rania.
 Thakurpukur Maheshtala CD Block consists of six gram panchayats: Joka I,Joka II, Asuti I, Asuti II, Chatta and Raspunja.

Industry
The Alipore Sadar subdivision includes Budge Budge, an old industrial town on the bank of the Hooghly, The jute industry, a major talking-point about the area has been facing labour unrest and sheer competition from jute mills in Bangladesh. A slightly older report by Shodganga mentions 9 jute mills in Budge Budge and 1 in Maheshtala. The MSME report mentions 6 jute mills and Budge Budge Municipality talks of four major jute mills – Budge Budge Jute Mill, Cheviot Jute Mill, Caledonian Jute Mill and New Central Jute Mill. Birla Jute Mill is at Birlapur. Such giants as Budge Budge and Allied Jute Exports Ltd have closed. India Linoleums Ltd. at Birlapur produces linoleum. Budge Budge has a number of oil storage units. Bata India opened its first shoe factory in 1934 at Batanagar.Budge Budge Thermal Power Station of CESC Limited  has a generating capacity of 750 MW.

“The whole of the jute mill area in Bengal was located on the either side of the river Hooghly, in a radius of about 50 kilometer north and south of Calcutta from Bansberia in the north, to Budge Budge in the South,” said a report of the Vidyasagar University. It further said that although jute mill workers were earlier local people, subsequently migrants formed a sizeable section of the population, because “agriculture in Bengal was more remunerative than work in the jute mills but what the jute mills paid was enough to attract labour from Bihar, Orissa, UP, CP and even Tamilnadu”. Much the same happened in other industries of the period.

Education
South 24 Parganas district had a literacy rate of 77.51% as per the provisional figures of the census of India 2011. Alipore Sadar subdivision had a literacy rate of 81.14%, Baruipur subdivision 77.45%, Canning subdivision 70.98%, Diamond Harbour subdivision 76.26% and Kakdwip subdivision 82.04%
  
Given in the table below (data in numbers) is a comprehensive picture of the education scenario in South 24 Parganas district, with data for the year 2013-14:

.* Does not include data for portions of South 24 Parganas district functioning under Kolkata Municipal Corporation

The following institutions are located in Alipore Sadar subdivision:
Budge Budge College was established at Budge Budge in 1971.
Budge Budge Institute of Technology was established at Nischintapur, Budge Budge in 2009. It offers, diploma, degree and post graduate courses.
Maheshtala College was established at Maheshtala in 2009.
Saheed Anurup Chandra Mahavidyalaya was established at Burul in 1991.
Asutosh College Second Campus at Bhasa.
Vidyanagar College was established at Vidyanagar in 1963.

Healthcare
The table below (all data in numbers) presents an overview of the medical facilities available and patients treated in the hospitals, health centres and sub-centres in 2014 in South 24 Parganas district.  
 

Note: The district data does not include data for portions of South 24 Parganas district functioning under Kolkata Municipal Corporation. The number of doctors exclude private bodies.

Medical facilities in Alipore Sadar subdivision are as follows:

Hospitals: (Name, location, beds)

M.R.Bangur District Hospital, Tollygunge, Kolkata, 620 beds
Vidyasagar State General Hospital, Behala, Kolkata, 256 beds
Baghajatin State General Hospital, Baghajatin, Kolkata, 100 beds
Bijoygarh State General Hospital, Bijoygarh, Kolkata, 100 beds
Garden Reach State General Hospital, Garden Reach, Kolkata, 68 beds
A.T.Dhar Memorial Hospital, Budge Budge, 28 beds
Budge Budge Municipal Hospital, Budge Budge, 28 beds
Budge Budge ESI Hospital, Budge Budge, 300 beds
Barisha Hospital, Barisha, Kolkata, KMC, 20 beds
ESI Hospital and Occupational Health Centre, Joka, 143 beds

Rural Hospitals: (Name, CD block, location, beds) 

Amtala Rural Hospital, Bishnupur II CD block, Amtala, 50 beds
Lakshmibala Dutta Rural Hospital, Budge Budge II CD block, PO Bakrahat, 30 beds
Benjanhari Acharial Rural Hospital, Budge Budge I CD block, PO Buita, 30 beds

Block Primary Health Centres: (Name, CD block, location, beds)

Chandidaulatabad Block Primary Health Centre, Bishnupur I CD block, PO Nepalganj, 10 beds
Samali Block Primary Health Cenre, Bishnupur II CD Block, Samali, PO Nahazari, 10 beds
 Sarsuna Block Primary Health Centre, Thakurpukur Mahestala CD block, Sarsuna, 15 beds

Primary Health Centres: (CD block-wise)(CD Block, PHC location, beds)

Bishnupur I CD block: Julpia (PO Andharmanik) (6), Amgachhia (PO Nepalganj) (10)
Bishnupur II CD block: Moukhali (PO Charshyamdas) (6)
Budge Budge I CD block: Biraj Lakshmi (PO Pujali) (6), Jamalpur (6)
Budge Budge II CD block: Burul (6), Gojapoali (PO Poali)(6)
There are primary health centres – Haridevpur (PO Paschim Putiary) (2) and Garfa (6)- located in Kolkata

Legislative Assembly Segments
As per order of the Delimitation Commission in respect of the Delimitation of constituencies in West Bengal, the areas under Bishnupur II CD Block along with seven gram panchayats under the Budge Budge II CD Block, viz. Burul, Chakmanik, Gaja Poyali, Kamrabad, Naskarpur, Rania and Satgachhia, will form the Satgachhia (Vidhan Sabha constituency). The other four gram panchayats under the Bishnupur II CD Block, the Budge Budge Municipality, the Pujali Municipality and the area under the Budge Budge I CD Block will together form the Budge Budge (Vidhan Sabha constituency). The gram panchayats of Asuti I, Asuti II, Chatta and Raspunja under the Thakurpukur Maheshtala CD Block and the areas under the Bishnupur I CD Block will together form the Bishnupur (Vidhan Sabha constituency). Wards 66, 67, 91, 92, 107, 108 of Kolkata Municipal Corporation will together form the Kasba (Vidhan Sabha constituency). Wards 96, 99, 101–106, 109, 110 of Kolkata Municipal Corporation will form the Jadavpur (Vidhan Sabha constituency). Wards 94, 95, 97, 98, 100, 111–114 of Kolkata Municipal Corporation will form the Tollyganj (Vidhan Sabha constituency). Wards 118, 119, 125–132 of Kolkata Municipal Corporation will form the Behala Paschim (Vidhan Sabha constituency). The Behala Purba (Vidhan Sabha constituency) will cover the area under wards 115–117 and 120–124 of the Kolkata Municipal Corporation, and the gram panchayats of Joka I and Joka II under the Thakurpukur Maheshtala CD Block. Wards 8, 11–35 of the Maheshtala Municipality will form the Maheshtala (Vidhan Sabha constituency). Wards 1–7, 9, 10 of the Maheshtala Municipality and wards 136–141 of the Kolkata Municipal Corporation will together form the Metiaburuz (Vidhan Sabha constituency). The Bishnupur legislative assembly constituency will be reserved for Scheduled Castes (SC) candidates. The legislative assembly constituencies of Satgachhia, Bishnupur, Maheshtala, Budge Budge and Metiaburuz will be legislative assembly segments of the Diamond Harbour (Lok Sabha constituency). The legislative assembly constituencies of Jadavpur and Tollyganj will be legislative assembly segments of the Jadavpur (Lok Sabha constituency). The legislative assembly constituencies of Kasba, Behala Paschim and Behala Purba will be legislative assembly segments of the Kolkata Dakshin (Lok Sabha constituency).

References

Subdivisions of West Bengal
Subdivisions in South 24 Parganas district
South 24 Parganas district